German submarine U-991 was a Type VIIC U-boat of Nazi Germany's Kriegsmarine during World War II.

Construction 
The U-991 was laid down on 30 October 1942 at the Blohm & Voss yard in Hamburg, Germany. She was launched on 24 June 1943 and commissioned on 29 July 1943 under the command of Oberleutnant zur See Diethelm Balke. Her U-boat emblem was a diving eagle.

She was assessed at  submerged. She had two shafts and two  propellers.

The submarine was fitted with five  torpedo tubes (four fitted at the bow and one at the stern), fourteen torpedoes, one  deck gun (220 rounds) and a  Flak M42 anti-aircraft gun. The boat had a complement of 44 to 57 men.

Service history
U-991 was used as a Training ship in the 5th U-boat Flotilla from 29 July 1943 until 31 August 1944 before serving in the 11th U-boat Flotilla for active service on 1 September 1944.

Training and tests 
During U-991'''s service as a training ship, she completed a number of trainings and tests for the Kriegsmarine.

 Active Service 
During her active service, U-991 made 1 patrol and left Kristiansand on 15 October 1944. Her patrol lasted 73 days and U-991 patrolled the North Atlantic from Norway, around the United Kingdom and Ireland and also to France before returning to Bergen. She arrived in Bergen on 26 December 1944, which marked the end of her first and only patrol during World War II.

In total, the U-991 spend 98 days at sea during her active service until 9 May 1945.

 Capture And End U-991 surrendered on 9 May 1945 at Bergen, Norway to the Allied Forces. The submarine was transferred from Bergen to Scapa Flow on 2 June 1945 and from Scapa Flow to Loch Ryan on 5 June 1945. She stayed in Loch Ryan for her immersion in Operation Deadlight (post-war Allied operation) until 11 December 1945, when she was towed to sea by the British Navy tug HMS Freedom (W.139).U-991'' was sunk at 12.15am on 11 December 1945 in the North Atlantic, North-West off the coast of Ireland by a torpedo from the British submarine HMS Tantivy.

References

Bibliography

German Type VIIC submarines
U-boats commissioned in 1943
World War II submarines of Germany
Ships built in Hamburg
1943 ships
Maritime incidents in December 1945
Operation Deadlight
Shipwrecks in the Atlantic Ocean